Saint James is an unincorporated community in Morrow County, in the U.S. state of Ohio.

History
A post office called Saint James was established in 1890, and remained in operation until 1935. Besides the post office, Saint James had a railroad station and a country store.

References

Unincorporated communities in Morrow County, Ohio
1890 establishments in Ohio
Populated places established in 1890
Unincorporated communities in Ohio